The 2003 Formula Renault 2000 Masters season was the thirteenth Eurocup Formula Renault 2.0 season. The season began at Brno on 24 May and finished at the Donington Park on 26 October, after eight races. Cram Competition's Esteban Guerrieri who is also Argentine Formula Renault champion won three races on his way to the championship by a 36 point margin over Danish driver Robert Schlünssen, who won abandoned race at Assen. ASM's Simon Pagenaud was two points behind Schlünssen. Pagenaud also won second races on TT Circuit Assen. Other wins were scored by Paul Meijer, Ryan Sharp and Reinhard Kofler.

Driver Lineup

Calendar

Championship standings

Drivers
Points are awarded to the drivers as follows:

‡ Points were not awarded in the first race at Assen as race was abandoned after three laps due to massive crash.

Teams

References

Masters
Formula Renault 2000 Masters
Renault Eurocup